Basalt fibers are produced from basalt rocks by melting them and converting the melt into fibers.
Basalts are rocks of igneous origin. The main energy consumption for the preparation of basalt raw materials to produce of fibers is made in natural conditions.
Basalt continuous, staple and super-thin fibers are produced and used.
Basalt continuous fibers (BCF) are used for the production of reinforcing materials and composite products, fabrics and non-woven materials. Basalt staple fibers - for the production of thermal insulation materials.
Basalt superthin fibers (BSTF) - for the production of high quality heat and sound insulating and fireproof materials.

Manufacture
The technology of production of basalt continuous fiber (BCF) is a one-stage process: melting, homogenization of basalt and extraction of fibers. Basalt is heated only once. Further processing of BCF into materials is carried out using "cold technologies" with low energy costs.

Basalt fiber is made from a single material, crushed basalt, from a carefully chosen quarry source. Basalt of high acidity (over 46% silica content) and low iron content is considered desirable for fiber production. Unlike with other composites, such as glass fiber, essentially no materials are added during its production. The basalt is simply washed and then melted.

The molten rock is then extruded through small nozzles to produce continuous filaments of basalt fiber.

The basalt fibers typically have a filament diameter of between 10 and 20 μm which is far enough above the respiratory limit of 5 μm to make basalt fiber a suitable replacement for asbestos. They also have a high elastic modulus, resulting in high specific strength—three times that of steel. Thin fiber is usually used for textile applications mainly for production of woven fabric. Thicker fiber is used in filament winding, for example, for production of compressed natural gas (CNG) cylinders or pipes. The thickest fiber is used for pultrusion, geogrid, unidirectional fabric, multiaxial fabric production and in form of chopped strand for concrete reinforcement. One of the most prospective applications for continuous basalt fiber and the most modern trend at the moment is production of basalt rebar that more and more substitutes traditional steel rebar on construction market.

Properties

The table refers to the continuous basalt fiber specific producer. Data from all the manufacturers are different, the difference is sometimes very large values.

Comparison:

History
The first attempts to produce basalt fiber were made in the United States in 1923 by Paul Dhe who was granted . These were further developed after World War II by researchers in the US, Europe and the Soviet Union especially for military and aerospace applications. Since declassification in 1995 basalt fibers have been used in a wider range of civilian applications.

Schools
RWTH Aachen University. Every two year RWTH Aachen University's Institut für Textiltechnik hosts the International Glass Fibers Symposium where basalt fiber is devoted a separate section. The university conducts regular research to study and improve basalt fiber properties. Textile concrete is also more corrosion-resistant and more malleable than conventional concrete. Replacement of carbon fibers with basalt fibers can significantly enhance the application fields of the innovative composite material that is textile concrete, says Andreas Koch.
The Institute for Lightweight Design at the TU Berlin
The Institute for Lightweight Design Materials Science at the University of Hannover
The German Plastics Institute (DKI) in Darmstadt
The Technical University of Dresden had contributed in the studying of basalt fibers. Textile reinforcements in concrete construction - basic research and applications. The Peter Offermann covers the range from the beginning of fundamental research work at the TU Dresden in the early 90s to the present. The idea that textile lattice structures made of high-performance threads for constructional reinforcement could open up completely new possibilities in construction was the starting point for today's large research network. Textile reinforcements in concrete construction - basic research and applications. As a novelty, parallel applications to the research with the required approvals in individual cases, such as the world's first textile reinforced concrete bridges and the upgrading of shell structures with the thinnest layers of textile concrete, are reported.
University of Applied Sciences Regensburg, Department of Mechanical Engineering. Mechanical characterization of basalt fibre reinforced plastic with different fabric reinforcements – Tensile tests and FE-calculations with representative volume elements (RVEs). Marco Romano, Ingo Ehrlich.

Uses

Heat protection
Friction materials
Windmill blades
Lamp posts
Ship hulls
Car bodies
Sports equipment
Speaker cones
Cavity wall ties
Rebar
Load bearing profiles
CNG cylinders and pipes
Absorbent for oil spills
Chopped strand for concrete reinforcement
High pressure vessels (e.g. tanks and gas cylinders)
Pultruded rebar for concrete reinforcement (e.g. for bridges and buildings)

Design codes

Russia
Since October 18, 2017, JV 297.1325800.2017 "Fibreconcrete constructions with nonmetallic fiber has been put into operation. Design rules, "which eliminated the legal vacuum in the design of basalt reinforced fiber reinforced concrete. According to paragraph 1.1. the standard extends to all types of non-metallic fibers (polymers, polypropylene, glass, basalt and carbon). When comparing different fibers, it can be noted that polymer fibers are inferior to mineral strengths, but their use makes it possible to improve the characteristics of building composites.

See also
 Pele's hair
 Mineral wool
 Glass wool
 Beta cloth

References

Bibliography
E. Lauterborn, Dokumentation Ultraschalluntersuchung Eingangsprüfung, Internal Report wiweb Erding, Erding,bOctober (2011).
K. Moser, Faser-Kunststoff-Verbund – Entwurfs- und Berechnungsgrundlagen. VDI-Verlag, Düsseldorf, (1992).
N. K. Naik, Woven Fabric Composites. Technomic Publishing Co., Lancaster (PA), (1994).
Bericht 2004-1535 – Prüfung eines Sitzes nach BS 5852:1990 section 5 – ignition source crib 7, für die Fa. Franz Kiel gmbh&Co. KG. Siemens AG, A&D SP, Frankfurt am Main, (2004).
DIN EN 2559 – Luft- und Raumfahrt – Kohlenstoffaser-Prepregs – Bestimmung des Harz- und Fasermasseanteils und der flächenbezogenen Fasermasse. Normenstelle Luftfahrt (NL) im DIN Deutsches Institut für Normung e.V., Beuth Verlag, Berlin, (1997).
Epoxidharz L, Härter L – Technische Daten. Technical Data Sheet by R&G, (2011).
Quality Certificates for Fabrics and Rovings. Incotelogy Ltd., Bonn, January (2012).
 
 
L. Papula, Mathematische Formelsammlung für Naturwissenschaftler und Ingenieure. 10. Auflage, Vieweg+Teubner, Wiesbaden, (2009).
 
 
• Osnos S, Osnos M, «BCF: developing industrial production for reinforcement materials and composites». JEC Composites magazine / N° 139 March - April 2021, p.19 – 24.

• Osnos S., Rozhkov I. «Application of basalt rock-based materials in the automotive industry». JEC Composites magazine / N° 147, 2022, p. 33 – 36.

External links
The production of basalt fibers Information from the Uzbekistan state scientific committee
Basalt Continuous Fiber - Information and Characteristics
Basalt Roving Dome Video demonstration of concrete construction reinforced with basalt fiber
Generation 2.0 of Continuous Basalt Fiber Comparing the technologies used in CBF production
Compressive behavior of Basalt Fiber Reinforced Composite
Product range of Basfiber products offered by Kamenny Vek
Extruded Acrylic Sheet - Excellent Thermoforming Capabilities
Some aspects of the technological process of continuous basalt fiber CBF
Video demonstration of production of continuous basalt fiber at Kamenny Vek

Basalt
Composite materials
Synthetic fibers